Winter Sports 2: The Next Challenge, known in Europe as Winter Sports 2009: The Next Challenge, is a multi-sport simulation released in 2008 for the Xbox 360, PlayStation 2, Wii, and Nintendo DS. It was developed by German studio 49 Games and is the sequel to Winter Sports: The Ultimate Challenge. The game features 16 winter sports events in 10 different disciplines with 16 countries represented.

Sports and events
Downhill skiing
Super-G, slalom, and giant slalom
Ski jumping
Normal hill
Large hill
Snowboarding halfpipe
Bobsledding
Two-women
Four-man
Women's luge
Men's skeleton
Speed skating
500m
1500m
Curling
Biathlon
Figure skating

Nations represented

 Austria 
 Canada
 Finland
 France 
 Germany  
 Great Britain
 Italy 
 Japan
 Netherlands
 Norway
 Poland
 Russia
 Spain 
 Sweden 
 Switzerland
 United States

Reception

The DS and Wii versions received "mixed" reviews, while the PlayStation 2 and Xbox 360 versions received "generally unfavorable reviews", according to the review aggregation website Metacritic. In Japan, where the Wii version was ported and published by Arc System Works on March 19, 2009, Famitsu gave it a score of all four sixes for a total of 24 out of 40.

See also
 Winter Sports: The Ultimate Challenge

References

External links
 Conspiracy Entertainment's site
 RTL Games's site (German)
 Developer's site (German)
 
 

2008 video games
Skiing video games
Wii games
PlayStation 2 games
Xbox 360 games
Nintendo DS games
Snowboarding video games
Figure skating video games
Video games developed in Germany
Conspiracy Entertainment games
Multiplayer and single-player video games
Arc System Works games